Peter Frederik Steinmann (8 July 1812 – 16 February 1894) was a Danish officer and Minister of War who served in the First and Second Schleswig Wars.

Early Years and Education
Steinmann was a son of Lieutenant General  and was born in Copenhagen on 8 July 1812. He entered military service in 1823 and in 1826, as an artillery cadet and in 1830, a second lieutenant in the artillery with the age order from 1826. He came immediately after entering as a student at the recently established Royal Danish Defence College, from which he resigned 4 years later as First Lieutenant and Deputy in the General Staff, but did not come into service with it until after going through the schools of the infantry and cavalry. In 1839 he became adjutant at the staff, and the following year he made a business trip to most European states, after which in 1841 he gained the captaincy of seniority. On 11 August the same year, he married Anna Johanne Elisabeth Countess Schulin (30 October 1813 in Frederiksdal - 10 September 1847 in Copenhagen), daughter of Chamberlain , County Governor , after he had previously accompanied Adjutant General Carl Ewald on a bathing trip to the south of France, which he also did in 1842. In the same year he was appointed captain of the General Staff, and since he had considerable worldly experience in addition to considerable skill, he was sent to Lüneburg in 1843 to take part in the preparations for the 10th German Federal Corps' camp assembly, and was later sent to various other troop assemblies in Germany. In 1843 he also became a Knight of Dannebrog.

First Schleswig War
Because of poor health, he had in 1846 through a Badekur in Ems, and when his wife died the following year on 10 September and this event took so much on his mental health, his subsequent winter traveled to Italy. There he was informed of the outbreak of the revolt, for which reason he immediately went home; but he did not receive any active command, as he was employed as chief of staff at the general command on Funen. In May, however, he succeeded in becoming chief of staff of the right flank corps, being promoted to major, but after General Frederik Bülowhad taken command of the corps, he had to return to his former position, where he was appointed chamberlain. Thus he did not come into the fire until the following year; he then became Chief of Staff to General Olaf Rye and took part in the battles at Kolding, Almind - Dons , Vejle and Aarhus, which during the whole retreat in Jutland he made so much profit that in June he was given the rank of lieutenant colonel. He did not follow his general to Fredericia, but remained as chief of staff to General C.L.H. Flindt, who took command of the troops at Helgenæs, and when this corps disbanded in September, he returned to the general command on Funen. 

In the following war year, Steinmann was employed as chief of staff by General C.F. Moltke at the 1st Division, which with honor participated in the battle of Helligbæk and in the battle of Isted, after which he was appointed lieutenant colonel. After the conclusion of the peace, Steinmann became chief of staff at the General Command in Schleswig, which difficult position he held until a short interruption from 1853 until 1854 until the autumn of 1862. At that time he advanced both to colonel in 1854 and to major general in 1862. He later became Commander of Dannebrog 1857 and participated in several troop gatherings, just as he also in 1858 attended the exercises of the 10th Federal Corps.

Second Schleswig War
In the spring of 1863 he was assigned to the 3rd Infantry Brigade, with which he participated in the troop assembly at Schleswig the same autumn, but already on 22 October he took over the command of the 3rd General Command District after Lieutenant General Georg Schøller's death and then became 1st Division Commander on November 1 with staff quarters in Kiel. There he was given a difficult task, as the division was partly to ensure the Army's possible advance in the Danewerk position, and partly to keep the population in check, all the while threatening a federal execution. Only 3 days before the German troops moved into Holstein on 23 December, he was given the necessary instructions for his relationship, stating that he should eventually evacuate the duchy, which was also completed on 29 December. 

From the beginning of January, the 3rd Division occupied the Dannevirke position from Slien to fortification no. 13, whose corps position at Selk and Jagel was attacked by the Austrians on 3 February, while it was handed over to the division, as the evacuation was to be launched 2 days later to form the army's rear guard. Steinmann performed this duty with tirelessness and zeal, and he watched with great care the Battle of Sankelmark, where he was wounded in the leg by a piece of grenade. Without being noticed, however, he sat on horseback, and only after the fight was over did he ride back to Flensburg, where he had to be lifted off the saddle and then sent to the Garrison Hospital in Copenhagen. Even before the wound was healed, he enlisted in the field army on 12 April and was then given command of the 1st Division, which the next day moved into the Dybbøl position, but had returned to Als when the attack took place on 18 April. The other day Steinmann was active in the bridgehead and at Sønderborg, and when the high command was then relocated to Funen, he became commander-in-chief of Als. As such he certainly warned against pulling too many troops away from the island, but his performances went unnoticed, and when the Prussians attacked on 29 June, he was ordered to retreat. The brigade's unsuccessful attempt to retake Kærby, quickly realized the situation and therefore gave and at around 5:30 am, began the retreat, by which the loss of Als was consummated. That the government did not attribute the responsibility to him for this is clear from the fact that on 4 July he was appointed lieutenant general and the next day general. The Army received this appointment consistently with sympathy, and the day-command issued by him made a good impression, but then by 12 July Armistice negotiations were initiated, he was only given the opportunity to make very careful arrangements for Funen's defense.

Minister of War
After the Treaty of Vienna, Steinmann, who on 1 November had received the Grand Cross of Dannebrog with the Commander's Cross being earned in 1857. He was then appointed Commanding General of Jutland, in which position he won the respect and devotion from both his subordinates and the civilian population and was given a special position to be master of Tybjerggård. Steinmann complied with the call and took over the Ministry of War, showed himself accommodating just to the Left as he wasn't reluctant to reduce the infantry's first training period from 5 to 6 months; but nevertheless he did not succeed in putting any of his proposals through before the whole ministry collapsed by 11 June 1875.

Later Years
When it proved difficult to get the post of commanding general in Jutland occupied, Steinmann was asked to take it over again in December 1877, and he remained there until he was dismissed due to age in 1882, while at the same time being placed à la suite. Steinmann then retired to Tybjerggård, where he often gathered a larger circle of older and younger comrades around him and with lively interest continued to follow the development of events. He didn't have a magnificent nature, but was a brave soldier and a very conscientious, punctual superior who was carefully within the Army's administrative regulations and had a clear eye for terrain and fencing conditions.

He died on 16 February 1894 and was buried at the Tybjerg Church. Steinmannsgade in Frederiksbjerg, Aarhus was named after the general in 1911.

References

Bibliography
 Peder Nieuwenhuis, "Steinmann, Peter Frederik", i: C.F. Bricka (red.), Dansk Biografisk Lexikon, København: Gyldendal 1887-1905.
 Thomas Hansen Erslew, Almindeligt Forfatterlexicon for Kongeriget Danmark med tilhørende Bilande fra 1814.
 Vort Forsvar, page. 346.
 Illustreret Tidende, V, 329 og XXXV, Page. 23.

1812 births
1894 deaths
19th-century Danish military personnel
People of the First Schleswig War
Danish military personnel of the Second Schleswig War
Knights of the Order of the Dannebrog
Commanders of the Order of the Dannebrog
Grand Crosses of the Order of the Dannebrog